Giovanni Battista Boazio or Battista Boazio (fl. 1588 – 1606) was an Italian draftsman and cartographer. He mapped Sir Francis Drake's voyage to the West Indies and America.

He spent a long period working in England, and made a map of Ireland that was then used in the Theatrum Orbis Terrarum. He was sponsored by Robert Devereux, 2nd Earl of Essex to draw a map illustrating the Capture of Cadiz, which was engraved by Thomas Cockson.  Other cartographic drawings includes Cartagena de las Indias, Santo Domingo in the island of Hispaniola, Saint Augustine, Florida and the Cape Verdean island of Santiago, the Santiago engraving was one of the first to depict of that of any island in Cape Verde.

References
Carl Moreland and David Bannister (1986), Antique Maps, p. 71.

Notes

External links 
 WorldCat page
 Reuters Rare old British atlas sells for $1.3 million
 Map and views Illustrating Sir Francis Drake's West Indian voyage, 1585-6. From the Collections at the Library of Congress
 “The Political Force of Images,” Vistas: Visual Culture in Spanish America, 1520-1820.

16th-century Italian cartographers